Shurab-e Zar (also Romanized as Shūrāb-e Zār; also known as Shūrāb-e Lor and Shūrāb-e Pā’īn) is a village in Bakesh-e Do Rural District, in the Central District of Mamasani County, Fars Province, Iran. At the 2006 census, its population was 24, in 6 families.

References 

Populated places in Mamasani County